Sun Jinliang (born January 1946) is an academician of the Chinese Academy of Engineering (CAE) and professor of material science and engineering in Shanghai University.

References

1946 births
Living people
Scientists from Shanghai
Engineers from Shanghai
Members of the Chinese Academy of Engineering
Engineering educators
Chinese materials scientists
Academic staff of Shanghai University
Educators from Shanghai
20th-century Chinese engineers